Khamaed is a gewog (village block) of the Gasa dzongkhag (district) in Bhutan. It was formerly known as Goenkhamae.

References 

Gewogs of Bhutan
Gasa District